Merry Christmas, George Bailey is a 1997 television broadcast directed by Matthew Diamond and starring Bill Pullman, Penelope Ann Miller, Nathan Lane, Sally Field and Martin Landau.  It is an adaptation of the 1946 film It's a Wonderful Life, which is based on the 1943 short story "The Greatest Gift" by Philip Van Doren Stern. Filmed live, it is a  recreation of Lux Radio Theater's 1947 production  of It's A Wonderful Life.

Cast
Bill Pullman as George Bailey
Martin Landau as Pa Bailey/Mr. Potter
Penelope Ann Miller as Mary Hatch Bailey
Nathan Lane as Clarence
Sally Field as George's mother
Joe Mantegna as Nick the bartender
Christian Slater as Harry/Sam Wainwright
Minnie Driver as Violet Bick
Jerry Van Dyke as Uncle Billy
Carol Kane as Mary's mother
Bronson Pinchot
Robert Guillaume as Mr. Gower
Mae Whitman as Zuzu

References

External links
 
 www.youtube.com/watch?v=C12raEGdv9k

American television films
1997 television films
1997 films
American fantasy films
Films directed by Matthew Diamond
1990s English-language films
1990s American films